Bill Callinan (1921-1998) was an Australian professional rugby league footballer who played in the 1950s.  He played for Western Suburbs as a winger.

Playing career

Callinan made his debut for Western Suburbs in 1952 against Balmain at Pratten Park.  The same year Wests defeated South Sydney 22–10 in the grand final claiming their fourth and final premiership.  The match was remembered due to its controversy with Souths claiming they were denied two legitimate tries and Western Suburbs being awarded a try off a blatant knock on.  Callinan played one more season with Western Suburbs in 1953.  At representative level, Callinan played for Queensland on two occasions.

References

1921 births
1998 deaths
Western Suburbs Magpies players
Rugby league players from Sydney
Rugby league wingers
Australian rugby league players